Raymond Michael Grant (born 1 September 1996) is a Scottish professional footballer who currently plays for Clyde. Grant began his career as a youth player for Norwich City, before progressing to the first team in 2015. He has since played for Dagenham & Redbridge, Clyde, Alloa Athletic and Stirling Albion. Grant has also played for the Scotland U19s.

Club career
Grant was raised in Morningthorpe, Norfolk, and started his career with local side Norwich City, joining them at under-15 level in 2010. He progressed through the various youth teams to go on and sign his first professional contract in April 2015. He became a regular in the under-21 squad and signed a one-year contract extension in June 2016 as Norwich were relegated from the Premier League to the EFL Championship. During the 2016–17 season he featured for the under-23 side in the newly formed Premier League 2 development competition and also featured in four EFL Trophy fixtures. In January 2017, he made his first-team debut in the FA Cup third-round replay 1–0 defeat to Southampton, replacing Ben Godfrey as a late substitute. In February 2017, he was sent out on loan to National League challengers Dagenham & Redbridge on a youth loan until the end of the season. He made his debut a couple of days later, playing the first half in the 2–1 home defeat to Guiseley. He struggled to break into the starting line-up and only made three appearances during his loan spell before he was recalled by Norwich in late March. Grant was released by Norwich at the end of the 2016–17 season.

Grant signed for Scottish League Two club Clyde in February 2018. In August 2020, Grant signed for Scottish Championship side Alloa Athletic, the club managed by his father Peter. Both Grants left Alloa at the end of the 2020–21 season, and Ray signed for Stirling Albion in May 2021. On 6 May 2022, Grant rejoined former club Clyde on a one-year contract.

International career
Grant received his first call-up to Scotland in August 2014 for the under-19 side for a friendly against Belgium. He started the match in the 2–0 defeat, which later proved to be his only international appearance. He also received a call-up to the friendly against Czech Republic in September, but failed to make an appearance.

Personal life
Grant comes from a footballing family with his father, Peter Grant, a former Scotland international who played for Celtic and Norwich, and also managed the latter. His older brother, Peter Grant Jr. plays along side Raymond at Clyde FC

Career statistics

References

External links

1996 births
Living people
Footballers from Glasgow
Association football midfielders
Scottish footballers
Scotland youth international footballers
Norwich City F.C. players
Dagenham & Redbridge F.C. players
Clyde F.C. players
National League (English football) players
Scottish Professional Football League players
People from Morningthorpe
Sportspeople from Norfolk
Anglo-Scots
Alloa Athletic F.C. players
Stirling Albion F.C. players